Yuri Nikolayevich Vasenin (2 October 1948 – 2 May 2022) was a Soviet football player and coach.

International career
Vasenin made his debut for the USSR on 29 June 1972 in a friendly against Uruguay. He played in the qualifiers for 1974 FIFA World Cup, but the USSR did not qualify for the final tournament.

Honours
 Soviet Top League: 1972

References

External links
  Profile

1948 births
2022 deaths
People from Chernyakhovsk
Soviet footballers
Russian footballers
Association football midfielders
Soviet Union international footballers
FC Baltika Kaliningrad players
FC Dynamo Stavropol players
FC SKA Rostov-on-Don players
Soviet Top League players
Russian football managers
FC Baltika Kaliningrad managers
Sportspeople from Kaliningrad Oblast